= A351 =

A351 may refer to:

- Airbus A350-1000 airliner

A351 road may refer to:

- A351 road (Great Britain), a road in Dorset, connecting Lytchett Minster to Swanage
- A351 road (Kazakhstan), a road in Almaty Province in the southeast of the country
